The volleyball tournaments of UAAP Season 69 ran from December 3, 2006 to February 21, 2007 at various locations within Metro Manila which include Rizal Memorial Coliseum, University of The Philippines Human Kinetics Gym and Ateneo Blue Eagle Gym.

Men's tournament

Elimination round

Bracket

First seed playoff

|}

Semifinals

FEU vs. NU

|-
!colspan=10|FEU advances to the Finals
|}

UP vs. UST

|-
!colspan=10|UP advances to the Finals
|}

Finals

|-
!colspan=10|FEU wins series 2–0
|}

Awards
* Most Valuable Player: 
 Rookie of the Year: 
 Best Scorer: 
 Best Spiker: 
 Best Blocker: 
 Best Setter: 
 Best Server: 
 Best Receiver: 
 Best Digger:

Women's tournament

Elimination round

Bracket

First seed playoff

|}

Semifinals

FEU vs. UE

|-
!colspan=10|FEU advances to the Finals
|}

UST vs. AdU

|-
!colspan=10|UST advances to the Finals
|}

Finals

|-
!colspan=10|UST wins series 2–0
|}

Awards
* Most Valuable Player: 
 Rookie of the Year: 
 Best Scorer: 
 Best Spiker: 
 Best Blocker: 
 Best Setter: 
 Best Server: 
 Best Receiver: 
 Best Digger:

References 

UAAP Season 69
UAAP volleyball tournaments